Delta Air Lines Flight 1141 was a scheduled domestic passenger flight between Dallas/Fort Worth, Texas and Salt Lake City, Utah. On August 31, 1988, the flight, using a Boeing 727-200 series aircraft, crashed during takeoff, resulting in 14 deaths and 76 injuries of the 108 on board.

Aircraft 
The aircraft was a Boeing 727-200 Advanced, registration , a three-engine narrow-body jet aircraft. It was delivered to Delta Air Lines in November 1973, and was the 992nd Boeing 727 to be manufactured. The aircraft was powered by three Pratt & Whitney JT8D-15 turbofan engines. The plane had recorded more than 43,000 flight hours before the crash.

Crew 
The flight crew consisted of Captain Larry Lon Davis (age 48), First Officer Carey Wilson Kirkland (37); and Flight Engineer Steven Mark Judd (30). The cabin crew consisted of four flight attendants: Dixie Dunn (56); Diana George (40); Rosilyn Marr (43); and Mary O'Neill (57).

Crash
Flight 1141 was a regularly scheduled passenger flight from Jackson Municipal Airport in Jackson, Mississippi, to Salt Lake City International Airport in Salt Lake City, Utah, with an intermediate stop at Dallas/Fort Worth International Airport (DFW) in North Texas. The Wednesday morning flight from Jackson to DFW was uneventful, and Flight 1141 arrived at DFW at 07:38 CDT. For the flight from DFW to Salt Lake City, Flight 1141 had 101 passengers and seven crew members on board.

At 08:30, Flight 1141 departed from the gate at DFW and was cleared by the ground controller to taxi to runway 18L. The aircraft was instructed to line up on the runway and hold for one minute due to the possibility of wake turbulence from an American Airlines DC-10 that was departing. The crew requested to extend the hold to two minutes, which was granted. The crew talked to the flight attendants for a while about what they would say on the cockpit recorder in case they crashed. Eventually this chat ceased as the crew was cleared for takeoff. The takeoff was normal until the main wheels left the ground, at which point the aircraft commenced a violent rolling motion and the right wing dropped. The aircraft's tail made contact with the runway briefly, and  later, the right wingtip struck the runway. The aircraft developed compressor surges (due to breakdown of the airflow through the engine), and was unable to gain altitude or maintain stabilized flight. Approximately  beyond the end of runway 18L, the plane's right wing hit the ILS localizer antenna, which set the wing on fire and caused it to start disintegrating while the plane was still in flight. Fire erupted in the right wing area and quickly spread and engulfed the rear of the aircraft. The total flight time was 22 seconds, from liftoff to the first ground impact.

Casualties
Two of the four flight attendants (Dunn and Marr) and 12 of the 101 passengers on board died in the crash. Medical examinations determined that all but one of the fatalities were due to smoke inhalation. One passenger, who had successfully exited the aircraft, attempted to re-enter the aircraft in order to assist his wife and other passengers still trapped inside; he suffered severe burns and died 11 days after the accident from his injuries.

Captain Davis, First Officer Kirkland, two cabin crew members, and 22 passengers were seriously injured. Flight Engineer Judd and 49 passengers received minor injuries; 18 passengers received no injuries. Many of the passengers reported that impact forces were not severe and mostly concentrated towards the back of the aircraft. First Officer Kirkland was badly bruised and sustained a concussion.

Investigation

Aircraft performance
The National Transportation Safety Board (NTSB) investigation into the accident attempted to reconstruct the aircraft's performance based on reports from witnesses and survivors.  Witnesses reported that the plane attempted to climb at a higher than normal angle, and that the plane rolled from side to side and appeared to be out of control. Based on examination of the wreckage, the NTSB determined that collision with the instrument landing system (ILS) localizer antenna array approximately  beyond the departure end of the runway 18L led to the breakup of the aircraft. Leaking jet fuel started a fire that quickly engulfed the fuselage. Engine #3 had separated from the empennage. Passengers reported that the plane appeared to shake violently on takeoff. Witnesses on the ground claimed that one of the engines was on fire, but although the engine was badly crushed from ground impact, there was no sign of fire or heat damage. Delta officials quickly reacted to questions about the 727's operating and maintenance condition by pointing out that the original factory engines from 1973 (when the plane was initially purchased by the airline) had been replaced in the last few years by a newer model that ran more quietly and used less fuel. They also stated that there were no known mechanical or maintenance problems with the plane prior to the flight.

The NTSB examined why the plane was unable to climb once it departed the runway.  After conducting airplane performance studies, the NTSB determined that the events of Flight 1141 could only be explained by the aircraft attempting to take off without its flaps and slats extended to the proper take-off configuration.  The aircraft's instability and sudden roll to the right was consistent with known performance of the Boeing 727 with the flaps and slats retracted.  The captain continued to pull back on the control column in an attempt to keep the plane's nose raised, which created turbulence over the rear-mounted engines and caused the compressor surges.  However, the NTSB concluded that the compressor surges would not have significantly reduced the engines' thrust, and that the plane's failure to gain speed was due to aerodynamic drag on the aircraft due to the high angle of attack, rather than a loss of engine thrust.  The NTSB examined the CVR and noted that the Pilot and Co-Pilot are heard announcing the deployment of the flaps but the sound of the flap lever movement is never heard.Based on the aircraft's failure to climb at takeoff speed, its roll instability, the position of the flap's jackscrews in the fully retracted position, and the absence of sounds indicating the flaps or slats were deployed, the NTSB determined that the plane's failure to climb resulted from the flight crew's failure to deploy the flaps and slats as required by the pre-flight checklist.

Based on the lack of warning sounds on the CVR, the NTSB also determined that the plane's take-off warning system (TOWS), designed to alert the crew if the engines are throttled to take-off power without the flaps and slats being correctly set, failed to alert the pilots to their improper takeoff configuration. The switch that operated the TOWS in the incident aircraft had been previously modified, per Boeing instructions, to prevent nuisance activations during aircraft taxiing.  A fleet-wide Boeing 727 inspection, ordered by the Federal Aviation Administration following the Flight 1141 crash, identified 35 anomalies in the TOWS out of 1,190 aircraft examined.  The FAA had recommended that the Boeing 727 TOWS be changed from a system activated by the aircraft throttles to one activated by engine pressure ratio (EPR), and while Delta owned Boeing 727s that had an EPR-activated TOWS, these were all aircraft that Delta had acquired from other airlines, and Delta did not convert its own aircraft to an EPR-activated system. The NTSB concluded that the TOWS had not activated because it had an intermittent problem that was not detected or corrected during the aircraft's last maintenance action.

Crew and airline performance
The NTSB investigated the relationship between crew performance and the events in the accident. FAA regulations require a sterile cockpit before takeoff, which means there is to be no conversation unrelated to the aircraft and pending flight. However, the cockpit voice recorder (CVR) tapes recorded extensive nonessential conversation, including about the CVR itself, the crash of Continental Airlines Flight 1713, and the dating habits of the flight attendants. The CVR also showed that prior to takeoff, the flight crew was distracted by chatting with a flight attendant about the upcoming presidential election, drink mixes, and various other topics unrelated to the operation of the aircraft. Of the flight crew, the first officer was most actively engaged in these nonessential conversations, with the captain only occasionally joining in. However, while the captain did not actively participate in these nonrelevant conversations, he also failed to stop the first officer's repeated interruptions and conversations with the flight attendant.  The NTSB determined that, if the captain had taken a more active role in managing the cockpit, the accident might have been prevented.

Shortly after an NTSB hearing in which the CVR transcripts were discussed, all three members of the flight crew were fired from Delta. However, the airline itself was also faulted. The NTSB determined that Delta did not insist on standardized crew cockpit management, and that flight crews were allowed significant latitude in their conduct of cockpit operations.  This lax corporate philosophy contributed to the poor discipline and performance of Flight 1141's flight crew.  The NTSB also found that the FAA was already aware of deficiencies in Delta's operations regarding flight crew performance, but that neither Delta nor the FAA had taken sufficient corrective actions to eliminate already known performance deficiencies among Delta flight crews.

Probable cause and dissent
On September 26, 1989, the NTSB published its final accident report.  In it, the NTSB ultimately determined that there were two probable causes for the accident: (1) inadequate cockpit discipline that resulted in the flight crew's failure to extend the aircraft's flaps and slats to proper take-off configuration, and (2) the failure of the plane's TOWS to sound and alert the crew that their plane was not properly configured for takeoff.  Contributing to the crash was Delta's slow implementation of changes to its flight crew management programs, a lack of sufficiently aggressive FAA action to compel Delta to correct known deficiencies, and a lack of sufficient accountability within the FAA's air carrier inspection process.

One member of the safety board, Jim Burnett, dissented from the NTSB's probable cause statement. While Burnett concurred with the accident report's facts and findings, he believed that the actions of the FAA and Delta were direct causes of the accident and not merely contributing factors. Burnett's dissent proposed a probable cause statement that included the two probable causes named in the main report, while adding a third probable cause:

Aftermath
Although the NTSB specifically faulted the captain and co-pilot for the accident, and did not fault Judd (the flight engineer), Judd was unable to find work as a commercial pilot after being fired from Delta.  A former Navy pilot, Judd worked as a reserve pilot at Naval Air Station Dallas while appealing his firing.  Judd was later reinstated by Delta.

Media broadcast of the CVR tapes, which demonstrated why the crew failed to extend the airplane's flaps or slats for takeoff, provoked such an outcry by pilots that subsequent releases of CVR data have been restricted by law and carefully vetted by the NTSB.  The law prohibits the NTSB from generally releasing CVR transcripts or recordings; while an exception permits the NTSB to release transcripts related to a safety investigation, there is no exception permitting the NTSB to release copies of the actual recordings.

Dramatization
The crash was featured in the third episode of season 18 of Mayday. The episode is titled "Deadly Distraction".

References

External links



Cockpit Voice Recording from 1141
The crash of Flight 1141/Crash resurrects memories of 1985 

Airliner accidents and incidents in Texas
Airliner accidents and incidents caused by pilot error
Aviation accidents and incidents in the United States in 1988
Dallas/Fort Worth International Airport
1141
Accidents and incidents involving the Boeing 727
Tarrant County, Texas
1988 in Texas
August 1988 events in the United States